The Indian locomotive class WDM-3A is a class of diesel–electric locomotive that was developed in 1993 by Banaras Locomotive Works (BLW), Varanasi for Indian Railways. The model name stands for broad gauge (W), Diesel (D), Mixed traffic (M) engine, with 3300 horsepower (3A). The WDM-3A is a later classification of earlier WDM-2C. They entered service in 1994. A total of 143+ were built at ALCO and Banaras Locomotive Works between 1994 and 2003 with rest of the 1246 units being rebuilt from WDM-2 which made them the most numerous class of mainline diesel locomotive until the WDG-4.

The WDM-3A is one of the most successful locomotives of Indian Railways serving both passenger and freight trains for over 26 years. A few WDM-3A units were exported to neighboring countries like Sri Lanka and Bangladesh. Despite the introduction of more modern types of locomotives like WDG-4 and electrification, a significant number are still in use, both in mainline and departmental duties. As of April 2022, 769 locomotives still retain "operational status" on the mainline as WDM-3A, with further examples having been converted back to WDM-2 or WDM-2S. The loco is now widely used across India for long-distance passenger trains due to its ruggedness and high tractive loads and acceleration.

History

The first one was delivered on August 22, 1994, it was then WDM-2C. First 57 units produced till March 1996 (Indian Railway road number 14001–14057) had rounded front hood profile similar to contemporary newer classes of locos built by DLW (WDG3A and WDP1). 

After that there was a gap of long four years in the WDM-3A production line in BLW. These units have been retro-fitted with dual brakes, in addition to the air and vacuum brakes. The gear ratio is 65:18. These new locomotives had their control stand shifted to the left side of the cabin. Meanwhile, Diesel Loco Modernization Works (erstwhile Diesel Modification Works which again was known as Diesel Component Works) in Patiala started rebuilding the existing WDM-2 locomotives, which had reached midlife, with upgraded power-packs. DLMW Patiala re-calibrates the power-pack and upgrades the output power rating to 3100HP. DLW again started building WDM-3A from the year 2000 and continued till the end of 2002 with locomotive road numbers in the range 14058–14143. All the locomotives rebuilt by DLMW and later batch from DLW had regular WDM-2 type square short hood profile and control stand position. DLW again built WDM-3A variant locomotives, during 2005–2006, in the road number range 14144-14167 which were classified as WDM-3B due to their difference in bogie design from classic ALCo asymmetrical trimount to HAHS design which was employed in WDG2 and later WDM-3D classes too. Most of the WDM-B were later converted to WDM-3D. 

In 2011, DLMW rebuilt locomotive number 16502 as WDM-3A and equipped it with an Electronic Fuel Injection (EFI) system jointly developed by Engine Research Laboratory of IIT Kanpur, Engine Development Directorate of RDSO, and DLMW Patiala.  DLMW continues to rebuild WDM-2 as WDM-3A and recently they have started rebuilding the DLW built WDM-3A too when they reach their midlife. Recent rebuilt locomotives are rated at 3300 HP, and from 2009 onward they are equipped with Daulat Ram DBR, and since 2014 they are also equipped with an Auxiliary Power Unit (APU) in the short hood. Some rebuilt locomotives have Co-Co-fabricated ATHS (Advanced Trimount High Speed) bogies instead of ALCo cast-iron type.  All the rebuilt WDM-3A bear the  suffix to their road numbers.
 
In 2012 Bangladesh Railway ordered 26 WDM-3A from DLW. They are classified as Class 6500 there. These units, however, lack the dynamic braking which happens to be an essential component in their Indian counterparts.

Sub-classes

WDM-3C 
The WDM-3C were just upgraded and more powerful WDM-3As with the ALCO engine gain rebuilt to output 3300 hp. It was the first follow-up experiment after the WDM-3A to squeeze more power out of the ALCO engine, an intermediary that would later lead to the development of the WDM-3D. Not many were produced, all of which were rebuilds of the WDM-2 or WDM-3A and were identical to the previous variants in every aspect. They can no longer be found over the railway network as all of them have been rebuilt into the WDM-3A or WDM-2 type.

Locomotive sheds

Technical specifications
Technical details are as follows:

See also

Indian locomotive class WDM-2
Indian Railways
List of diesel locomotives of India
Rail transport in India

References

M-3A
Banaras Locomotive Works locomotives
Co-Co locomotives
5 ft 6 in gauge locomotives
Railway locomotives introduced in 1994